Bible Lessons International (BLI) is a non-profit Bible study ministry and 501(c)(3) corporation based in Marshall, Texas. The ministry, according to information published on its website, "is dedicated to reaching the world for Jesus Christ with the goal of empowering God's people to interpret the Bible for themselves." Verse-by-verse, exegetical commentaries are offered entirely for free by the organization, which says its materials are "committed to the trustworthiness and authority of Scripture, emphasizing the intent of the original inspired authors by means of their historical setting, literary context, grammatical features, choice of words, genre and parallel passages."

History 
BLI was founded in Lubbock, Texas in 1976 under its original name of International Sunday School Lessons, Inc. by Dr. Robert James (Bob) Utley, a retired professor of Biblical Hermeneutics (interpretation). A certificate of restated articles of incorporation with the new name of Bible Lessons International was issued by the Secretary of the State of Texas on Sept. 30, 1998. The organization currently has its offices in Marshall, Texas. BLI is funded by individual donors from all over the world, and publishes a semi-annual newsletter that is sent to nearly 10,000 people on the organization's mailing list.

In its early days, BLI published written materials through the Uniform Sunday School Series offered by the Southern Baptist Convention. Utley also presented his commentaries in the "You Can Understand the Bible" television series and radio programs. Materials in the form of printed commentaries, cassette tapes and VHS tapes, as well as CDs and DVDs, were also offered for sale on the organization's original website, www.biblelessonsintl.com.

Activities 
At present, BLI distributes its free materials through its website www.freebiblecommentary.org. Here are posted for free download the entire collection of Dr. Utley’s audio, video and written commentaries, sermons and other Bible study aids. All materials are copyrighted, but can be printed or copied if credit is given to Dr. Utley and if a link to the website is included in the copied material.

Resources offered by BLI may also be obtained at other online locations and libraries, including www.WorldCat.org, www.archive.org, www.ibiblio.org, East Texas Baptist University's online Mamye Jarrett Library and www.logos.com.

Written Bible commentaries are presently offered or currently undergoing translation into the following languages: Afrikaans, Amharic, Arabic, Armenian, Bangla, Bulgarian, Burmese, Chinese, English, Eritrean, French, Hebrew, Hindi, Hungarian, Indonesian, Korean, Malayalam, Nepali, Oromo, Persian, Portuguese, Pashto, Punjabi, Russian, Saraki, Serbian, Sindhi, Slovak, Spanish, Tagalog, Tamil, Telugu, Thadou, Thai, Turkish, Urdu and Vietnamese. The pace of translations has increased over the years, with more than 50 different translations in progress as of late 2010.

BLI's first CD compilation was published in 2005 as "The NASB (Update) Study Bible New Testament Supplement." The CD contained English commentaries with Biblical cross-references from the following Bible translations: The New American Standard (1995 update), New King James Version, New Revised Standard Version, Today’s English Version and the New Jerusalem Bible. Subsequent releases were entitled: "CD-ROM Computer Bible Commentary" (2009), and "Verse-By-Verse Computer Bible Study Library" (2010).

As of Fall 2015, more than 150,000 free CDs and DVDs containing Bible study guide commentaries and multimedia sermons and commentaries had been distributed to people in more than 146 countries. BLI's most recent publication, the "Verse-By-Verse Computer Bible Study Library," is a free two-disc set containing a CD with all of Dr. Utley's written Old and New Testament commentaries, translations and other Bible study helps, plus a DVD containing more than 850 minutes of video, 600 minutes of MP3 audio and the PDF version of Dr. Utley's "Bible Interpretation Seminar Textbook." The DVD also includes MP4 video files that can be downloaded and viewed by iPod and iPhone users. As of 2019 over 3 million people have visited the www.freebiblecommentary.org website.

In addition to mailing CDs and DVDs to individuals, BLI has sent entire sets of printed commentaries to numerous state and federal prison libraries. The materials are also distributed through several organizations, including the National Baptist Educational Convention, World Baptist Alliance and Sovereign World Trust.

Organization 
Bible Lessons International is overseen by a Board of Directors. BLI has sponsored several overseas pastors’ conferences, and has contributed to National-to-National (N2N) evangelism projects conducted by International Commission (www.ic-world.org) of Lewisville, Texas.

References

External links 
 www.biblelessonsintl.com
 www.freebiblecommentary.org

Christian publishing companies
Non-profit organizations based in Texas
Christian organizations established in 1976
Marshall, Texas
1976 establishments in Texas